Orlando Pineda Torres (born 15 February 1986) is a retired Mexican football, who last played as a midfielder for Oaxaca on loan from UNAM.

Club career
He previously played for Pumas UNAM (commonly called Pumas) and made 8 appearances for them in the 2008–09 CONCACAF Champions League. He made his sole Primera División de Mexico appearance for the Pumas on 12 October 2008.

References

External links
 
 
 

1986 births
Living people
Mexican footballers
Club Universidad Nacional footballers
Querétaro F.C. footballers
Club León footballers
Correcaminos UAT footballers
C.D. Veracruz footballers
Liga MX players
Mexican people of Salvadoran descent
Association football defenders